Ralph Abercromby, 2nd Baron Dunfermline  (6 April 1803 – 2 July 1868) was a Scottish nobleman and diplomat, styled The Honourable from 1839 to 1858.

Life

Ralph Abercromby was the son and heir of James Abercromby, a barrister and Whig politician, and Lady Mary Anne (Marianne) Leigh. Abercomby was educated at Eton and Peterhouse, Cambridge.

He entered the Diplomatic Service, becoming an attaché at Frankfurt in 1821 and a précis writer in the Foreign Office in 1827. He was Secretary of Legation at Berlin from 1831 to 1835, and Minister at Florence from 1835 to 1838. On 18 September 1838 he married Lady Mary Elizabeth Gilberta Elliot-Murray-Kynynmound, daughter of the Earl of Minto. From 1838 to 1840 he was Minister to the German Confederation, from 1840 to 1851 Minister at Turin, and from 1851 to 1858 Minister at The Hague.

In 1851 he was awarded a Knight Commander of the Bath (KCB). Upon his father's death in 1858 he succeeded to the Barony, as 2nd Baron Dunfermline, and lived at the family home Colinton House, Midlothian (now in Edinburgh). In 1863 he was elected a Fellow of the Royal Society of Edinburgh, upon the nomination of Sir John M'Neill.

He died without a male heir in 1868, and the Barony became extinct.

References

External links

1803 births
1868 deaths
19th-century Scottish people
Diplomats from Edinburgh
People educated at Eton College
Alumni of Peterhouse, Cambridge
Barons Dunfermline
Diplomatic peers
Fellows of the Royal Society of Edinburgh
Knights Commander of the Order of the Bath
Ambassadors of the United Kingdom to the Netherlands
Ralph
Eldest sons of British hereditary barons